USS Scranton (SSN-756), a , is the second ship of the United States Navy to be named for Scranton, Pennsylvania.

The contract to build her was awarded to Newport News Shipbuilding and Drydock Company in Newport News, Virginia, on 26 November 1984, and construction began on 29 August 1986.  She was launched on 3 July 1989 sponsored by Mrs. Sarah McDade, and commissioned on 26 January 1991, with Commander J.G. Meyer in command.

Scranton was the first submarine at Newport News to be built via "modular construction".  No keel was laid.  In this method, the ship was almost fully built out in individual hull sections.  Most of the internal structure, machinery, and piping were loaded in via open ends of the hull sections as each hull section was built out.  The individual hull sections were later assembled with exact precision such that piping running between the sections was joined as the hull sections were welded together.  The ship was later rolled into a floating drydock and "floated"

In January 2006, Scranton successfully demonstrated homing and docking of an AN/BLQ-11 Long-Term Mine Reconnaissance System (LMRS) unmanned undersea vehicle (UUV) system during at-sea testing under the leadership of Commanding Officer Michael J Quinn.

Operation Odyssey Dawn
On 19 March 2011, the submarine launched Tomahawk cruise missiles at Libyan air defenses as part of Operation Odyssey Dawn.

References

External links 

 

  navsource.org: USS Scranton
united-states-navy.com: USS Scranton

External links

Los Angeles-class submarines
Cold War submarines of the United States
Nuclear submarines of the United States Navy
Ships built in Newport News, Virginia
1989 ships
Submarines of the United States
Scranton, Pennsylvania